Nick Hamman is a South African radio DJ. He is most well known for being a DJ on 5FM and host of the Hamman Time weekday show and 5Drive.

Early life and education
Nick Hamman was born and raised in Cape Town, South Africa. He studied politics and philosophy at Stellenbosch University in the Western Cape.

Career
Nick's career in broadcasting began in 2011 at Stellenbosch's community radio station MFM 92.6, where he as the host of the Afternoon Drive Show. During his time at MFM 92.6, he was both the host of the Afternoon Drive show as well as the station's technical producer. In 2012, he won an MTN Radio Award for Best Afternoon Campus Drive Show in South Africa. In the same year, he was the winner of Good Hope FM’s campus DJ search.

In 2014, he became one of the youngest presenters ever to host of a morning show on 5FM where he hosts mid-morning show, Hamman Time.

In 2016, he walked 330km between Johannesburg and Polokwane on a two week journey that was broadcast live on radio. He has also completed two Heritage Tours where he took to the road during the month of September in 2017 and 2018, each time driving over 10 000 km to document the stories of people and places around the country.
  
In 2018, he was featured on the SABC 3 lifestyle television programme, Top Billing. Later that year he performed at the Zafiko Music Festival in Durban. He has also performed at the Electric Summer Music Festival in Cape Town alongside the UK-based band, Clean Bandit and local musicians such as Goldfish and DJ Fresh.

In May 2020, Nick, who had previously hosted the Hamman Time show during the mid-morning slot, took over as the host of 5Drive.

Awards and nominations

References

External links
 

Living people
South African radio personalities
People from Cape Town
South African DJs
Year of birth missing (living people)
South African radio presenters